The Palestine women's national under-20 football team, colloquially known as "The Redeemers", is the official national team that represents Palestine in football for young women.The team is controlled by the Palestinian Football Association. It is sometimes referred to as the under-19 or under-18 national team.

The team has never qualified for the FIFA U-20 Women's World Cup or the AFC U-20 Women's Asian Cup and has not achieved any achievement so far.

History 
The women's national team played its first competitive match against Jordan on 18 October 2012 during the Asian Cup qualifiers. It ended with an 8–0 loss. They lost to Iran by the same margin in the following game, and they tied Tajikistan 2–2 in the penultimate game to earn Palestine its first-ever point. By goal differential versus Tajikistan, Palestine came in bottom.

Competitive record

FIFA U-20 Women's World Cup

AFC U-20 Women's Asian Cup

WAFF U-18 Girls Championship

Recent results and matches

2023

See also 
Palestine women's national football team
Palestine women's national under-17 football team
Palestine national under-20 football team
Women's football in Palestine
Football in Palestine

References 

Arabic women's national under-20 association football teams
under-20
Youth football in Palestine
Asian women's national under-20 association football teams